The Messerschmitt Me 309 was a prototype German fighter, designed in the early years of World War II to replace the Bf 109. Although it had many advanced features, the Me 309's performance left much to be desired and it had so many problems that the project was cancelled with only four prototypes built. The Me 309 was one of two failed Messerschmitt projects intended to replace the aging Bf 109, the other being the Me 209 of 1943.

Design and development
The Me 309 project began in mid-1940, just as the Bf 109 was having its first encounters with the Spitfire in the Battle of Britain, the first aircraft to match the 109 in speed and performance. Already, Messerschmitt anticipated the need for an improved design to replace the Bf 109. The Reich Air Ministry, however, did not feel the same urgency, with the project given a low priority, resulting in the design not being finalized until the end of 1941.

The new fighter had many novel features, such as tricycle landing gear (with a nosegear strut that twisted through 90° during retraction, to a "flat" orientation under the engine) and a pressurized cockpit, which would have given it more comfortable and effective high-altitude performance. Each of the new features was first tested on a number of Bf 109F airframes, the V23 having a ventral radiator, the V31 with a radiator and tricycle landing gear, and the V30 having a pressurized cockpit.

Low government interest in the project delayed completion of the first prototype until spring 1942, and trouble with the nosewheel pushed back the 309's first flight to July. When it did fly, the Me 309's performance was satisfactory – about 50 km/h (30 mph) faster than a standard Bf 109G – but not exemplary. In fact, the Bf 109G could out-turn its intended replacement. With the addition of armament, the aircraft's speed decreased to an unacceptable level. In light of its poor performance and the much more promising development of the Focke-Wulf Fw 190D, the Me 309 was canceled.

In an attempt to revive the project, initiated in response to a 1941 Reich Air Ministry requirement for a new Zerstörer (destroyer) to replace the Bf 110, Messerschmitt's response was the Me 609. In order to meet the requirement of a new design in a minimum of time and with a minimum of new parts, the failed Me 309 project would form the basis of the new fighter. The Me 609 would have joined the two Me 309 fuselages with a new centre wing section. Only the two inner wheels of the joined Me 309's main landing gears would have been used and would retract into the centre section. This resulted in an unusual four-wheel arrangement. The Me 609 would have had its cockpit in the port fuselage, the starboard being smoothed over. Two versions were planned: a heavy fighter with four or six 30 mm MK 108 cannon, and a Schnellbomber (Fast bomber) variant with two 30 mm MK 108 cannon and a bombload of 1,000 kg (2,200 lb) carried beneath the fuselages. By the time designs were being ironed out, the revolutionary Me 262 turbojet negated the need for further piston-engined fighter design.

In 1943, Messerschmitt made one last attempt at creating a replacement for the Bf 109 in the form of the Me 209-II. It was essentially a modification of the existing 109 airframe, Messerschmitt designers not wanting to invest the time and trouble in a new design like the Me 309.

Specifications (Me 309)

See also

References

Sources

 Green, William. War Planes of the Second World War, Fighters, vol. I. London: Hanover House, 1960.
 Jackson, Robert. Infamous Aircraft: Dangerous Designs and their Vices. Barnsley, Yorkshire, UK: Pen and Sword Aviation, 2005. .
 Lepage, Jean-Denis G.G. Aircraft of the Luftwaffe, 1935-1945: An Illustrated Guide. Jefferson, North Carolina: McFarland & Company, 2009. .
 Nowarra, Heinz J. Die Deutsche Luftrüstung 1933-1945: Band 3 Flugzeugtypen Henschel–Messerschmitt. (in German).  Bonn: Germany: Bernard & Graefe Verlag, 1993, pp. 215–218. .

External links

Fw 187 at WW2 in Color

Me 309
1940s German fighter aircraft
Single-engined tractor aircraft
Low-wing aircraft
World War II fighter aircraft of Germany
Aircraft first flown in 1942